Vincent Kipchumba (born 3 August 1990) is a Kenyan long-distance runner. In 2019, he won the Amsterdam Marathon with a time of 2:05:09.

In 2019, he also won the Adana Half Marathon and the Vienna City Marathon.

Achievements

References

External links 

 

Living people
1990 births
Place of birth missing (living people)
Kenyan male long-distance runners
Kenyan male marathon runners
20th-century Kenyan people
21st-century Kenyan people